The 1973 New York Yankees season was the 71st season for the team. The Yankees finished fourth in the American League East with a record of 80–82 under manager Ralph Houk, 17 games behind the division champion Baltimore Orioles. This was the last time that the Yankees finished the season below .500 until 1982. This was also their last year in the "old" Yankee Stadium (on the south side of 161st Street), which was targeted for major reconstruction in 1974–1975. During this period, the Yankees shared a home field with a National League team for the third time in their history, moving into Shea Stadium for two years.

George Steinbrenner 
The Yankees had been struggling during their years under CBS ownership, which had acquired the team in 1965. In 1972, CBS Chairman William S. Paley told team president E. Michael Burke the media company intended to sell the club. As Burke later told writer Roger Kahn, Paley offered to sell the franchise to Burke if he could find financial backing. Burke ran across Steinbrenner's name and veteran baseball executive Gabe Paul, a Cleveland-area acquaintance of Steinbrenner, helped bring the two men together.

On January 3, 1973, a group of investors led by George Steinbrenner and minority partner Burke bought the Yankees from CBS for $10 million.

The announced intention was that Burke would continue to run the team as club president. But Burke later became angry when he found out that Paul had been brought in as a senior Yankee executive, crowding his authority, and quit the team presidency on April 29, 1973. (Burke remained a minority owner of the club into the following decade.) He handed in his resignation to the New York Yankees, so that he could become president of Madison Square Garden.

It would be the first of many high-profile departures by employees who crossed paths with "The Boss". At the conclusion of the 1973 season, two more prominent names departed: manager Ralph Houk, who resigned and then signed to manage the Detroit Tigers; and general manager Lee MacPhail, who became president of the American League.

Offseason 
 November 24, 1972: Rob Gardner and a player to be named later were traded by the Yankees to the Oakland Athletics for Matty Alou. The Yankees completed the deal by sending Rich McKinney to the Athletics on December 1.
 November 27, 1972: John Ellis, Jerry Kenney, Charlie Spikes, and Rusty Torres were traded by the Yankees to the Cleveland Indians for Graig Nettles and Jerry Moses.
 Bobby Murcer signed a $100,000 contract with the Yankees. He was just the second player in Yankees history (behind Mickey Mantle) to earn a base salary of $100,000 in one season.

Regular season 
After the last game of the 1973 season on September 30, fans ripped out parts of the stadium, including the seats, to take as souvenirs. The stadium would be remodeled, and reopen in 1976. On July 1 the Yankees were 45-33 and leading the American League East by four games, but were only 35-49 rest of the way.

Season standings

Record vs. opponents

Opening Day lineup

Notable transactions 
 April 5, 1973: Frank Baker was traded by the Yankees to the Baltimore Orioles for Tom Matchick.
 June 5, 1973: Kerry Dineen was drafted by the Yankees in the 4th round of the 1973 Major League Baseball Draft.
 June 7, 1973: Frank Tepedino, Wayne Nordhagen and players to be named later were traded by the Yankees to the Atlanta Braves for Pat Dobson. The Yankees completed the deal by sending Dave Cheadle to the Braves on August 15 and Al Closter to the Braves on September 5.
 June 7, 1973: Sam McDowell was purchased by the Yankees from the San Francisco Giants.
 June 12, 1973: Mike Kekich was traded by the Yankees to the Cleveland Indians for Lowell Palmer.
 July 30, 1973: Jerry Kenney was signed as a free agent by the Yankees.
 August 7, 1973: The Yankees sent a player to be named later and cash to the St. Louis Cardinals for Wayne Granger. The Yankees completed the deal by sending Ken Crosby to the Cardinals on September 12.
 August 13, 1973: Bernie Allen was purchased from the Yankees by the Montreal Expos.
 August 18, 1973: Johnny Callison was released by the Yankees.

Roster

Player stats

Batting

Starters by position 
Note: Pos = Position; G = Games played; AB = At bats; H = Hits; Avg. = Batting average; HR = Home runs; RBI = Runs batted in

Other batters 
Note: G = Games played; AB = At bats; H = Hits; Avg. = Batting average; HR = Home runs; RBI = Runs batted in

Pitching

Starting pitchers 
Note: G = Games pitched; IP = Innings pitched; W = Wins; L = Losses; ERA = Earned run average; SO = Strikeouts

Other pitchers 
Note: G = Games pitched; IP = Innings pitched; W = Wins; L = Losses; ERA = Earned run average; SO = Strikeouts

Relief pitchers 
Note: G = Games pitched; W = Wins; L = Losses; SV = Saves; ERA = Earned run average; SO = Strikeouts

Farm system 

Kinston affiliation shared with Atlanta Braves

Awards and honors 

All-Star Game
Thurman Munson, catcher
Bobby Murcer, outfield, starter
Sparky Lyle, pitcher

Notes

References 
1973 New York Yankees at Baseball Reference
1973 New York Yankees team page at www.baseball-almanac.com

New York Yankees seasons
New York Yankees
New York Yankees
1970s in the Bronx